Larry Dale Wright (born October 8, 1951) is a Canadian former professional ice hockey centre. He played in 106 National Hockey League (NHL) games over parts of five seasons with the Philadelphia Flyers, California Seals, and Detroit Red Wings.

Career statistics

Regular season and playoffs

External links
 

1951 births
Living people
California Golden Seals players
Canadian expatriate ice hockey players in Germany
Canadian expatriate ice hockey players in the United States
Canadian ice hockey centres
Detroit Red Wings players
Düsseldorfer EG players
Ice hockey people from Saskatchewan
Kansas City Red Wings players
Minnesota Duluth Bulldogs men's ice hockey players
National Hockey League first-round draft picks
Philadelphia Flyers draft picks
Philadelphia Flyers players
Regina Pats players
Richmond Robins players
Salt Lake Golden Eagles (CHL) players
Sportspeople from Regina, Saskatchewan